Grover Simcox (1867–1966) was an American illustrator, naturalist and polymath in Philadelphia, Pennsylvania.

Early life 
Simcox was born in Allentown, Pennsylvania and moved to Philadelphia in 1901. Previously, he had worked in a variety of unremarkable careers in various fields. In Philadelphia, he studied the sciences at the University of Pennsylvania. While his coursework was generally poorly received, his accompanying illustrations were widely praised.

Career 
Simcox was in demand as an illustrator for the rest of his career. While he completed several notable portraits, he is best known for his illustrations of the plants and animals of his native Pennsylvania. Much of his work on plants was completed on the grounds of Fairmount Park. Several of his illustrations of aquatic life were featured in exhibits and lectures at the Philadelphia Aquarium.

Because of his height and preference for exceptionally large canvases (when painting), Simcox is sometimes called "Biggie" Grover Simcox. This nickname is not thought to have been applied during his lifetime.

References

External links 
 Dutch site

1867 births
1966 deaths
American illustrators
Artists from Allentown, Pennsylvania
Artists from Philadelphia
University of Pennsylvania alumni